Saskatoon East was a federal electoral district in Saskatchewan, Canada, that was represented in the House of Commons of Canada from 1979 to 1988.

This riding was created in 1976 from parts of Saskatoon—Humboldt riding.

It was abolished in 1987 when it was redistributed into Saskatoon—Dundurn and Saskatoon—Humboldt ridings.

Election results

See also 

 List of Canadian federal electoral districts
 Past Canadian electoral districts

External links 

Former federal electoral districts of Saskatchewan